Out of Syllabus is a 2006 Indian Malayalam-language film directed by Viswanathan. It was released on 17 February 2006.

Story

The film tells the story of Gopikrishnan, a village lad who goes to a city college, and becomes the butt of all jokes on the campus. Through constant effort and more than a little help from Namitha, he becomes the College Union Chairman. While at college he bumps into Gayathri, an old school mate of his. Their closeness drives a wedge between Gopi and Namitha, but they come back closer. The campus scenes have been picturized without a hint of exaggeration.

Cast

Arjun Sasi, who is a DJ with SS Music, plays the lead role. Praseetha who is a model turned actress, adopts the screen name of Niranjana and does her debut role as Namitha, the leading lady of the film. Parvathy Thiruvothu made her debut in Malayalam 2006 in this movie.

 Arjun Sasi as Gopikrishnan
 Niranjana as Namitha
 Shaalin Zoya as Jr. Gayathri
 M. R. Gopakumar
 Parvathy Thiruvothu as Gayathri
 Jayakrishnan as Manu
 Venu Nagavalli as Namitha's Uncle
 A. K. Lohithadas (Cameo Appearance)
 Tom George Kolath (Cameo Appearance)

Sound Track 
The film's soundtrack contains 7 songs, all composed by Bennet Veetraag and Lyrics by Rafeeq Ahamed.

References

2000s Malayalam-language films
Films scored by Bennet Veetraag